Sinitta Malone (born 19 October 1963), known mononymously as Sinitta, is a British singer, actress and television personality. She initially found commercial success in the mid-1980s with the single "So Macho" and had several other hits during the decade. In the 2000s, she became known for television appearances, including Loose Women, The Xtra Factor and This Morning. She took part in the ITV show I'm a Celebrity... Get Me Out of Here! in 2011.

Early life 
She was born in Seattle, Washington. Sinitta's mother is Miquel Brown, who was a popular Canadian disco-soul singer in the 1970s and 1980s and a member of the cast of Hair. Sinitta has said that she was born when her mother was only 14 years old but this was not true (she was 18). Sinitta's father's name is Anthony. She has a sister Gretta who was adopted by a relative. Sinitta was born and raised in Seattle and later Detroit, but frequently travelled with her mother on tour including to Sydney. Her mother then directed the London production of Hair; Sinitta was sent to boarding school in East Sussex, and ballet school in Tunbridge Wells from the age of 9. She auditioned for musical roles in London, performing in The Wiz at age 12 while still in school.

Career

Early career 
In 1981, Sinitta appeared in the film Shock Treatment as Frankie, credited as Sinitta Renet. Sinitta continued her career by appearing in several West End productions, notably the first production of the Andrew Lloyd Webber musical Cats. She also later appeared in Little Shop of Horrors.

1986–1988: Sinitta! and "So Macho" 
In 1986, Sinitta released the single "So Macho", which debuted at 59 on the UK charts; the single remained rather low in the charts but, later that year, reached number 16, climbing to number 5 the following week. The subsequent week, "So Macho" reached number 2 in the UK, scoring its highest position on the charts and also giving Sinitta her first Top 3 charting single. "So Macho" spent the following six weeks in the Top 20 in the UK. Alongside this success in the UK, "So Macho" also reached the Top 20 in Sweden, Australia and Austria. "So Macho" subsequently became the highest-charting of Sinitta's career to date. Sinitta's second single "Feels Like the First Time" was far less commercially successful, charting at number 45. In 1987, Sinitta released the lead single from her upcoming debut album, after seeking the help of rising super-producers Stock Aitken Waterman (SAW). The product of that collaboration, "Toy Boy", was based on a tabloid headline about Sinitta's love life, and featured a rap written by the singer. It debuted at number 41 and climbed to number 4 in the UK, where it remained for three consecutive weeks. The single remained in the Top 20 for eight weeks. The track also reached number 3 in Switzerland, reaching the Top 20 in Ireland, Belgium, Sweden, Finland and Germany. Sinitta then released the second single from the album, "GTO"; the single reached number 15 on the UK chart. "GTO" also became Sinitta's first hit in Spain, reaching number 3. The track reached number 11 in Switzerland, number 9 in Norway and number 13 in Ireland. The success of the track came despite the singer initially expressing her dissatisfaction with the subject matter of the song when first presented with the idea by record label boss, Simon Cowell. Fearing that the title would mean nothing to her core audience of gay men and younger record buyers, Sinitta had unsuccessfully begged producers Stock Aitken Waterman to retitle the track before recording. Sinitta later released her debut album Sinitta!, which performed moderately, charting at number 34 in the UK. This album also reached number 69 in Australia.

In 1988, Sinitta released "Cross My Broken Heart", taken from Sinitta!, which reached number 6 in the UK and number 7 in Ireland. The track charted at number 12 in Spain, becoming her second Top 20 single in Spain. Sinitta then released "I Don't Believe In Miracles", which reached number 22 in the UK.

1989–1990: Wicked and "Right Back Where We Started From" 
In 1989, Sinitta moved away from working directly with producers Stock Aitken Waterman amid creatives differences and the producers' changing priorities following the rise of their in-house superstar Kylie Minogue. However, Sinitta did continue to work with Pete Hammond, Phil Harding and Ian Curnow with PWL, in co-operation with German producer Ralf-René Maué who was responsible for such hits of the Hamburg-based eurodisco duo London Boys as "Harlem Desire'", "Requiem" and "London Nights". The second album was confirmed as Wicked. The lead single of the album was "Right Back Where We Started From", which debuted at number 19 in the UK and rose to number 6. The following week the track climbed to number 4 in the UK, holding this position for the subsequent week. For the subsequent four weeks, the single remained in the Top 40. It also charted across the rest of Europe, notably reaching number 7 in Finland and the Top 40 in Denmark, Spain and Germany. "Right Back Where We Started From" also charted successfully in Oceania, reaching number 7 in Australia and number 2 in New Zealand, thus becoming her highest charting single in both countries. In addition to this success, the track made the year-end charts, at number 45 in Australia, number 38 in New Zealand and number 49 in the UK. As a follow-up single, Sinitta released "Love on a Mountain Top", which charted at number 20 in the UK and number 81 in Australia.

The final lead single of the album, however, was the least successful out of the three, failing to chart at all. In 1990, Sinitta released the single "Hitchin' a Ride", which performed moderately, charting at number 20 in the UK, whilst "Love and Affection" peaked at number 62.

1992–1997: "Shame Shame Shame" and "Naughty Naughty" 
In July 1992, "Shame Shame Shame" debuted at number 31 in the UK, and later peaked at number 28.

The following April, Sinitta released the single "The Supreme (EP)", a 4 track EP containing covers of 4 songs originally by The Supremes which charted at number 49 in the UK. In 1995, Sinitta released a covers album called Naughty Naughty, which was also the only album of hers to be released in Asia.

She appeared on the cast recording album for What a Feeling, a live recording taken from the Apollo Playhouse Theatre, Edinburgh, in May 1997, and replaced Irene Cara to tour with Sonia (a fellow former SAW artist) and Luke Goss (formerly of Bros) in the rock and pop musicals concert, What a Feeling the same year.

In 1997, Sinitta recorded vocals for a cover of the Limme & Family Cookin' hit "You Can Do Magic" with Mike Stock and Matt Aitken, believing it to be her comeback single. However, the track was in fact an elaborate stunt by TV show The Cook Report, which aimed to expose alleged chart rigging by attempting to hype the track into the charts. The record was fronted by reporter Debbie Currie, who pretended to sing to Sinitta's vocal. The first Sinitta knew about it was when the show was aired, leaving her feeling used and betrayed.

2004–2023: The X Factor era, television and judging 
In 2004, Sinitta made her premiere appearance on The X Factor in the first series, when she assisted Simon Cowell at the Judges' Houses stage, helping to select his final three acts for the live show, with the eventual winner being Steve Brookstein. In 2005, Sinitta helped Cowell once more, this time choosing the final three groups. In 2006, she helped Cowell select Leona Lewis, who became the second winner chosen by them, with Lewis becoming one of the most successful acts from the show. In 2009, Sinitta returned to the show again for the Judges' Houses stage, and then helped to choose Olly Murs. In 2007, Sinitta became a judge on the ITV show Grease Is the Word.

The following year, Sinitta joined the cast of the daytime ITV show Loose Women as a presenter. In 2010, Sinitta helped Cowell again by choosing One Direction who have since become the biggest act to have come out of the X Factor. In 2011, however, Sinitta assisted Louis Walsh for the first time, rather than Cowell. In November that year, Sinitta was confirmed to be taking part in the eleventh series of I'm a Celebrity, Get Me Out of Here! as one of the contestants and would be entering the jungle on Day 3.

In 2013, Sinitta helped Walsh to select Nicholas McDonald, who eventually finished second. That same year, she appeared in the music video for a cover of the 1980s hit "Take On Me" on Children in Need. In December, she appeared on Celebrity Come Dine with Me, alongside Danniella Westbrook, Louie Spence and Hugo Taylor.

The following year, Sinitta was announced as joining the cast of the new upcoming Channel 4 reality TV show "The Jump". Sinitta was eliminated fourth overall, placing seventh.

Sinitta returned to her music career in 2014, with her comeback single being "So Many Men, So Little Time". She later performed the single at "Pride in London". Sinitta returned to assist Simon Cowell again that year, when she helped to choose Fleur East and Ben Haenow, who came second and won the show respectively.

In 2009, Sinitta became one of the main presenters on The Xtra Factor, on which she interviewed the contestants' friends and family. In 2011, she returned to the show during the live show stages as one of the presenters who visited the finalists' home towns. Her segment on the show became regular, and carried on into 2012 and subsequently 2013 and 2014. In 2016, she was announced as the producer and one of the lead presenters of the Xtra Factor; she stated that she had "revamped" the whole show.

Sinitta appeared in the hit reality TV show Ant & Dec's Saturday Night Takeaway as a recurring character in 2016. Alongside this, Sinitta became a series regular on the chat show Up Late with Rylan, and also made appearances on Celebrity Masterchef as a contestant, although she was eliminated in Week 1.

In October 2021, Sinitta announce the release of her first Christmas track, "I Won't Be Lonely This Christmas", scheduled for release on 3 December 2021.

Sinitta appeared as Kangaroo in an I'm a Celebrity...Get Me Out of Here! special episode of The Masked Singer.

Personal life 
Sinitta was married from 2002 to 2010 to Andy Willner, and has two adopted children. A series of autobiographical videos document her life, and a book is due to follow. Her past relationships and documentation of sexual assaults received media attention in 2018.

Discography 

 Studio albums
 1987: Sinitta!
 1989: Wicked
 1995: Naughty Naughty

Filmography

Films and television

See also 
 List of one-word stage names
 List of Dancing on Ice contestants
 List of I'm a Celebrity...Get Me Out of Here! (British TV series) contestants

References

External links 

 
 

1963 births
American emigrants to the United Kingdom
21st-century Black British women singers
20th-century Black British women singers
British dance musicians
Living people
Musicians from Seattle
Dance-pop musicians
I'm a Celebrity...Get Me Out of Here! (British TV series) participants
British people of African-American descent